Grabtown is an unincorporated community in Bertie County, North Carolina, United States.

See also

List of unincorporated communities in North Carolina

References

Unincorporated communities in Bertie County, North Carolina
Unincorporated communities in North Carolina